North Sydney Girls' High School (abbreviated as NSGHS, more commonly known as NSG) is a government-funded single-sex academically selective secondary day school for girls, located in Crows Nest, in Sydney, New South Wales, Australia.

Established in 1914, the school caters for approximately 910 students from Year 7 to Year 12. Admission to the school is based entirely on academic results through the Selective High Schools Test undertaken by students in Year 6.

In 2001, The Sun-Herald ranked North Sydney Girls High School first in Australia's top ten girls' schools, based on the number of its alumnae mentioned in the Who's Who in Australia. In 2022, North Sydney Girls High School ranked as the fourth high school in the state, based on the percentage of exams sat that achieved a Distinguished Achievers (DA)..

History

North Sydney Girls' High School was officially founded in 1914 with an enrolment of 194 students. The school was originally located on the corner of Hazelbank Road and the Pacific Highway (where Cammeraygal High School is now situated). By the 1980s, it was felt that the site could no longer meet the needs of the school, and years of intense lobbying for improved facilities followed. When the New South Wales Government decided to close Crows Nest Boys High School, the facility was transferred to North Sydney Girls. In December 1993, North Sydney Girls High officially moved to its current location, following a $6 million building and renovations project.

Academics

Enrolments
North Sydney Girls is an academically selective high school; admission to the school for Year 7 is determined by results in the Selective High Schools test, which is open to all Year 6 students in NSW. A small number of students from other high schools are accepted into years 8 to 12, with applications made to the school to sit for an entrance exam.

Award system
At North Sydney Girls High School, awards are given based on academic performance in the senior school only.

Academic results
The school performs well in public examinations, and in recent years has been placed as the leading girls' school in New South Wales in the Higher School Certificate (HSC) examinations. Annually, at least 30% of Year 12 students achieve places in the top 1% of the HSC.

Curriculum
North Sydney Girls High School is registered and accredited with the New South Wales Board of Studies, and therefore follows the mandated curriculum for all years.

Co- and extracurricular activities
NSGHS offers a diverse range of extracurricular activities.

Music and drama
NSGHS has a theatresports troupe, junior drama ensemble, Year 10 drama night, and various clubs available to seniors. They also have a combined annual musical with North Sydney Boys High School.

Instrumental ensembles and bands include the advanced string ensemble, stage (jazz) band, jazz ensemble, concert band, symphony orchestra, wind orchestra, wind ensemble, and beginner band. Choirs and vocal ensembles include Year 7 choir, junior choir, intermediate choir, combined (NSGHS & NSBHS) choir, senior vocal, and the a capella group.

Sport and outdoor activity
Co-curricular sports include basketball, skiing, hockey, cricket, badminton, table tennis, taekwondo, rowing, kayaking, touch football, water polo, fencing, netball, tennis, and volleyball. NSGHS also has a chess club, dance ensembles, and a cadet program at Marist Catholic College North Shore, and has had students participate in the Duke of Edinburgh Award Scheme.

Notable alumnae

Academic
Dame Valerie Beralbreast cancer epidemiologist
Anna Katherine DonaldRhodes Scholar (1989)
 Dame Janet Rittermanformer director of the Royal College of Music in London, from 1993 to 2005.

Entertainment, media and the arts
 Benita CollingsPlay School presenter
 Ruth Cracknellactress
 Ceridwen Doveyauthor
 Jill Hellyerauthor and poet
 Nathalie Kelleyactress
 Nicole Kidmanactress
 Samantha Langfilm and theatre director
 Catherine Martinproduction designer
 Lucy Maundercabaret and theatre performer
 Janet Pattersoncostume designer and production designer
 Cassandra Pybushistorian and author
 Margaret ThrosbyABC Classic FM presenter
 Naomi Wattsactress
 WengieYouTube personality, singer, voice actress

Politics, public service and the law
 Nicola Wakefield Evanslawyer and company director; partner of King & Wood Mallesons (1993-2013), non-executive director of Toll Holdings, Lend Lease Corporation, Macquarie Group and BUPA Australia & New Zealand; member of the University of NSW council of the Law School and director Asialink, University of Melbourne
 Verity FirthChief Executive Officer of the Public Education Foundation in Australia, a former NSW Minister for Education and Training, the former member for NSW Legislative Assembly seat of Balmain
 Shelley Hancockteacher and parliamentarian; elected as a member of the NSW Legislative Assembly for South Coast (Liberal Party)
 Justice Lucy McCallumJudge of the Supreme Court of NSW
 Nancy Grace Augusta Wakeresistance fighter known to the Germans as "the White Mouse"; the most decorated woman of World War Two

Sport
 Elise Simone Ashton (née Norwood)Olympic water polo player
 Renée KirbyWorld Championship-winning rower

Principals
The school principals have been:

See also 

 List of government schools in New South Wales
 List of selective high schools in New South Wales
 North Sydney Boys' High School

References

External links 

 North Sydney Girls High School

Educational institutions established in 1914
Girls' schools in New South Wales
Public high schools in Sydney
Selective schools in New South Wales
Crows Nest, New South Wales
1914 establishments in Australia